Ayatollah Mohammad Reza Tavassoli (1931–2008) was an influential Iranian theologian, reformist politician, and a close associate of Ayatollah Ruhollah Khomeini.Tavassoli was a member of the Expediency Discernment Council of the Islamic Republic of Iran.  He belonged to the Militant Clerics League.  Ayatollah Tavassoli simultaneously held a seat in the 3rd Assembly of Experts.

Tavassoli died on 16 February 2008, from a heart attack, while delivering a speech to the Expediency Council. He was 77 years old at the time of his death.

See also 
 List of members of Constitutional Amendment Council of Iran
List of Ayatollahs

References and notes 

1931 births
2008 deaths
Iranian Islamists
Iranian ayatollahs
Shia Islamists
Members of the Expediency Discernment Council
Members of the Assembly of Experts
Association of Combatant Clerics politicians
People from Mahallat